Shoolery's rule, which is named after James Nelson Shoolery, is a good approximation of the chemical shift δ of methylene groups in proton nuclear magnetic resonance. We can calculate shift of the CH2 protons in a A–CH2–B structure using the formula

where 0.23 ppm is the chemical shift of methane and the empirical adjustments  are based on the identities of the A and B groups:

External links
Organic Spectroscopy: Principles and Applications, page 206

Nuclear magnetic resonance